CCAAT/enhancer-binding protein alpha is a protein encoded by the CEBPA gene in humans. CCAAT/enhancer-binding protein alpha is a transcription factor involved in the differentiation of certain blood cells. For details on the CCAAT structural motif in gene enhancers and on CCAAT/Enhancer Binding Proteins see the specific page.

Function 

The protein encoded by this intronless gene is a bZIP transcription factor which can bind as a homodimer to certain promoters and gene enhancers. It can also form heterodimers with the related proteins CEBP-beta and CEBP-gamma, as well as distinct transcription factors such as c-Jun. The encoded protein  is a key regulator of adipogenesis (the process of forming new fat cells) and the accumulation of lipids in those cells, as well as in the metabolism of glucose and lipids in the liver. The protein has been shown to bind to the promoter and modulate the expression of the gene encoding leptin, a protein that plays an important role in body weight homeostasis. Also, the encoded protein can interact with CDK2 and CDK4, thereby inhibiting these kinases and causing cultured cells to stop dividing. In addition, CEBPA is essential for myeloid lineage commitment and therefore required both for normal mature granulocyte formation and for the development of abnormal acute myeloid leukemia.

Common mutations 
There are two major categories which CEBPA mutations can be categorized into. One category of mutations prevent CCAAT/enhancer-binding protein alpha DNA binding by altering its COOH-terminal basic leucine zipper domain. The other category of mutations disrupt the translation of the CCAAT/enhancer-binding protein alpha NH2 terminus. CEBPA mutations, which result in diminished CCAAT/enhancer-binding protein alpha activity, contribute to the transformation of myeloid antecedents.

Interactions 

CEBPA has been shown to interact with Cyclin-dependent kinase 2 and Cyclin-dependent kinase 4.

Clinical significance 

It has been shown that mutation of CEBPA has been linked to good outcome in both adult and pediatric acute myeloid leukemia patients.

Significance in acute myeloid leukemia 
Acute myeloid leukemia is characterized by genetic abnormalities in hematopoietic progenitors. This includes excessive proliferation of blasts, and blocking the hematopoiesis of granulocytes. It has been shown that suppression of CEBPA expression and blocking of CCAAT/enhancer-binding protein alpha stops the differentiation of myeloid progenitors. For this reason, CCAAT/enhancer-binding protein alpha's role during granulocyte differentiation and CEBPA's role as a tumor suppressor gene is critically important in the prognosis of acute myeloid leukemia.

Prognostic significance of CEBPA mutations 
CCAAT/enhancer-binding protein alpha, the transcription factor that is encoded by CEBPA, is very important in the differentiation of immature granulocytes. Mutation of the CEBPA gene has been shown to play a crucial role in leukemogenesis and prognosis in acute myeloid leukemia patients. In recent studies CEBPA mutations were found in between 7% and 15% of patients with acute myeloid leukemia. The three different types of mutations seen in these AML patients include germ-line N-terminal mutation, N-terminal frameshift mutation, and C-terminal mutation. These mutations are most frequently found in acute myeloid leukemia M1 or acute myeloid leukemia M2. Many reports link CEBPA mutations with a favorable outcome in acute myeloid leukemia. This is because these mutations are likely to induce differentiation arrest in these patients. Patients with CEBPA mutations have longer remission duration and survival time than those without the mutations. Therefore, the presence of CEBPA mutations are directly associated with a more favorable course for the progression of the disease.

Significance in solid tumors 
Recently it has been shown that epigenetic modification of the distal promoter region of CEBPA has resulted in downregulation of CEBPA expression in pancreatic cancer cells, lung cancer, and head and neck squamous cell carcinoma.

Methylation of CEBPA as a prognostic biomarker in AML patients 
A recent study has found that higher levels of CEBPA methylation are directly proportionate with treatment response. The complete response rate increased proportionately with the level of CEBPA methylation. For this reason it has been proposed that methylation of CEBPA could be a very useful biomarker in acute myeloid leukemia prognosis.

See also 
Ccaat-enhancer-binding proteins

References

Further reading

External links 
 
  GeneReviews/NIH/NCBI/UW entry on Familial Acute Myeloid Leukemia (AML) with Mutated CEBPA
 

Transcription factors